This is a partitioned list of percussion instruments showing their usage as tuned or untuned. See pitched percussion instrument for discussion of the differences between tuned and untuned percussion. The term pitched percussion is now preferred to the traditional term tuned percussion:

Each list is alphabetical.

Instruments normally used as tuned percussion
This group of instruments includes all keyboard percussion and mallet percussion instruments and nearly all melodic percussion instruments. Those three groups are themselves overlapping, having many instruments in common.

 Angklung
 Celesta
 Chime bar
 Cup chime 
 Glockenspiel
 Hand chime
 Marimba
 Metallophone
 Piano
 Steel pan
 Tubular bell
 Timpani (also known as kettle drums)
 Vibraphone
 Xylophone

Instruments normally used as untuned percussion
 Bass drum
 Bongo drum
 Conga
 Cymbal
 Gong
 Maracas
 Snare drum
 Timbales
 Tam-tam
 Triangle

Instruments commonly used in both roles

 Bell
 Crotales
 Cowbell 
 Hand bell
 Octoban
 Rototom
 Temple block
 Triangle

See also
 Pitched percussion instrument
 :Category:Pitched percussion instruments
 Indefinite pitch
 Tuning in untuned percussion
 Tuning a drum set

Notes and references

tuned